Hans Johnsen (January 3, 1865 – June 17, 1920) was a chief machinist serving in the United States Navy during the Spanish–American War who received the Medal of Honor for bravery.

Biography
Johnsen was born January 3, 1865,  in Sandnes, Norway  and after entering the navy was sent to fight in the Spanish–American War aboard the torpedo boat USS Winslow as a chief machinist.

Johnsen was warranted as a gunner on June 27, 1898, and was promoted to chief gunner on June 27, 1904.  During World War I, he received a temporary promotion to lieutenant on July 1, 1918.

He died June 17, 1920, and is buried in Bayview-New York Bay Cemetery Jersey City, New Jersey. His grave can be found in the Edgewood section, lot 468.

Medal of Honor citation
Rank and organization: Chief Machinist, U.S. Navy. Born: 3 January 1865, Sandnes, Norway. Accredited to: Pennsylvania. G.O. No.: 497, 3 September 1898.

Citation:

On board the torpedo boat Winslow during the action at Cardenas, Cuba, 11 May 1898. Showing great presence of mind, Johnsen turned off the steam from the engine which had been wrecked by a shell bursting in the cylinder.

See also

List of Medal of Honor recipients for the Spanish–American War

References

External links

1865 births
1920 deaths
People from Sandnes
United States Navy Medal of Honor recipients
United States Navy sailors
American military personnel of the Spanish–American War
Norwegian emigrants to the United States
Norwegian-born Medal of Honor recipients
Spanish–American War recipients of the Medal of Honor